Rodrigo Martín Cabalucci (born 22 July 1992) is an Argentine professional footballer who plays as a forward for Douglas Haig.

Career
Cabalucci's first club were Douglas Haig, he played for the club between 2011 and 2016; making one hundred and thirty-two appearances and scoring fifteen goals. His first league goal for Douglas Haig arrived in April 2011 during a 1–1 Torneo Argentino A tie with Rivadavia. After two seasons in Torneo Argentino A, Douglas Haig were promoted to Primera B Nacional after winning the 2011–12 Torneo Argentino A title. He scored on his professional career debut on 12 August, netting the winning goal in a 2–1 victory over Patronato. He remained with the club in Primera B Nacional for five campaigns.

In July 2016, Cabalucci joined Argentine Primera División side Olimpo. He subsequently scored six goals in seventeen matches in his debut season in the Primera División. Cabalucci didn't feature during 2017–18 due to injury, with Olimpo suffering relegation. In August 2018, Cabalucci joined Unión Santa Fe. Two months later, after not playing for Unión, Cabalucci was loaned to Primera B Nacional's Agropecuario.

Career statistics
.

Honours
Douglas Haig
Torneo Argentino A: 2011–12

References

External links

1992 births
Living people
People from Lomas de Zamora
Argentine footballers
Association football forwards
Torneo Federal A players
Torneo Argentino A players
Primera Nacional players
Argentine Primera División players
Club Atlético Douglas Haig players
Olimpo footballers
Unión de Santa Fe footballers
Club Agropecuario Argentino players
Sportspeople from Buenos Aires Province